The Bolivian Air Force ( or 'FAB') is the air force of Bolivia and branch  of the Bolivian Armed Forces.

History
By 1938 the Bolivian air force consisted of about 60 aircraft (Curtiss Hawk fighters, Curtiss T-32 Condor II and Junkers W 34 bombers, Junkers Ju 86 used as transport craft, and Fokker C.V, Breguet 19 and Vickers Vespa reconnaissance planes), and about 300 staff; the officers were trained in Italy.

In 2017 Bolivia finally retired the Lockheed T-33 marking the end of 44 years of service.  Bolivia was the last operator of the T-33.

Organization
FAB is organized into air brigades, which is formed by one to three air groups. The air groups are based at La Paz, Cochabamba, Santa Cruz de la Sierra, Puerto Suárez, Tarija, Villamontes, Cobija, Trinidad, Riberalta, Roboré, Uyuni, Oruro, Sucre and Chimoré.

Major commands included the following:
 General Command Systems Department in La Paz, equipped with sophisticated computers.

 Group of Air-Defense (Grupo Aereo de Defensa Anteaerea – GADA): GADA-91 (I BRIGADE), GADA-92 (II BRIGADE), GADA-93 (III BRIGADE), GADA-94 (IV BRIGADE), GADA-95 (V BRIGADE), GADA-96 (VI BRIGADE) and GADA-97 (I BRIGADE).
 Six air brigades with subordinate air groups.
 First Air Brigade (El Alto):
 Fighter group 31 "Gral. Jorge Jordán Mercado": Fighter squadron 311, Executive squadron 310
 Transport air group 71 "Gen.W.A.Rojas" (Military airlift TAM):Air squadron 710, Air squadron 711, Air squadron 712
 Aerophotogrammetry National Service (NSS)
 Air group 1 – Air group VIP
 Air group 66 – air base in Oruro
 Transporte Aereo Boliviano-TAB
 Task Force "Black Devils"
 Group air defence artillery GADA-91
 Group air defence artillery GADA-97
 Second Air Brigade (Cochabamba):
 Fighter group 34 "P.R.Cuevas": Aerotactico squadron 340, Link training squadron 341
 Air group search and rescue 51: Helicopter Squadron 511
 Air group training 22 – air base in Chimore (helicopter training)
 Air group 67 – air base in Sucre
Group air defence artillery GADA-92
 Third Air Brigade (Santa Cruz):
 Fighter group 32 "B.B.Rioja" (CEPAC): squadron 321, squadron 320, squadron 327 (maintenance)
 COLMILAV Air group training 21 – Training squadrons: primary squadron, basic squadron, squadron "NN" (prob.navigation)
 Air group 83(air base Puerto Suarez): 831 squadron
 Air group 61 "Gen.L.G.Pereiera (air base Robore): squadron 610
 Task force "Red Devils" (air base El Trompillo-Robore)
 Group air defence artillery GADA-93
 Fourth Air Brigade (Tarija):
 Air Group 82 "Cap.A.V.Peralta" (air base Camiri): squadron 821
 Air Group 63 "Tcnl.E.L.Rivera" (air base Villamontes): squadron 630
 Air Group 41 – (air base Tarija)
 Air group 65 – (air base Uyuni)
 Group air defence artillery GADA-94
 Fifth Air Brigade (Trinidad):
 Group air 72 – air base Trinidad
 Group air 62 – air base Riberalta
 Group air defence artillery GADA-95
 Sixth Air Brigade (Cobija):
 Group air 64 – air base Cobija
 Group air defence artillery GADA-96

Civil Aviation
The General Directorate of Civil Aeronautics formerly part of the FAB, administers a civil aeronautics school called the National Institute of Civil Aeronautics, and two commercial air transport services TAM and TAB.

Bolivian Military Airline (TAM)
Bolivian Military Airline is an airline based in La Paz, Bolivia. It is the civilian wing of the 'Fuerza Aérea Boliviana' (the Bolivian Air Force), operating passenger services to remote towns and communities in the North and Northeast of Bolivia. TAM (aka TAM Group 71) has been a part of the FAB since 1945.

A similar airline serving the Beni Department with small planes is Línea Aérea Amaszonas, using smaller planes than TAM.

The Bolivian Ministry of Defence and Ministry of Public Works, Services and Housing announced on 8 December 2016 that TAM would cease transporting civilian passengers and cargo on 16 December 2016. The decision was to allow TAM to reorganize with a status akin to the state-sponsored Boliviana de Aviacion prior to resuming service under civilian regulations.

Bolivian Air Transport (TAB)
Although a civil transport airline, Bolivian Air Transport (was created as a subsidiary company of the FAB in 1977. It is subordinate to the Air Transport Management and is headed by an FAB general. TAB, a charter heavy cargo airline, links Bolivia with most countries of the Western Hemisphere; its inventory included a fleet of Lockheed C-130 Hercules aircraft. TAB's Base of operations was headquartered at El Alto, adjacent to La Paz's El Alto International Airport. TAB also flew to Miami and Houston, with stops in Panama.

Aircraft

Current inventory

Future acquisitions
During a 31 July 2017 ceremony, which was attended by the armed forces' high command, four models of lead-in fighter trainers (LIFT; L-15, M-346, T-50, and Yak-130) were presented with a potential to replace the T-33 and reequip the GAC-31. The FAB's Commander expressed the FAB's preference for the Yak-130.

See also
 Bolivian Air Force Museum

References

Bibliography

External links

 Official site (Spanish)

Military of Bolivia
Air forces by country